Jameh Shuran is a village in Kurdistan Province, Iran.

Jameh Shuran may also refer to:
 Jameh Shuran-e Olya (disambiguation)
 Jameh Shuran-e Sofla (disambiguation)